The following is a list of notable deaths in January 2004.

Entries for each day are listed alphabetically by surname. A typical entry lists information in the following sequence:
 Name, age, country of citizenship at birth, subsequent country of citizenship (if applicable), reason for notability, cause of death (if known), and reference.

January 2004

1
Harold Henning, 69, South African golfer.
Elma Lewis, 82, American arts leader.
Manuel Félix López, 66, Ecuadorian politician.
Frederick Redlich, 93, Austrian-born American dean of the Yale University School of Medicine.
John Stoneham, 95, American baseball player (Chicago White Sox).

2
Etta Moten Barnett, 102, American actress.
Lynn Cartwright, 76, U.S. actress (A League of Their Own).
Sir John Grandy, 90, British Royal Air Force officer.
Paul Hopkins, 99, American baseball player, reported to be the oldest living former Major League Baseball player.
Dame Sheila McKechnie, 55, Scottish trade unionist, housing campaigner and consumer activist, head of Shelter, cancer.
Dennis Silverthorne, 80, American Olympic pairs figure skater (pairs figure skating at the 1948 Winter Olympics).

3
Lillian Beckwith, 87, English author.
Des Corcoran, 75, Australian politician, Premier of South Australia.
Taylor Duncan, 50, American baseball player (St. Louis Cardinals, Oakland Athletics).
David Lipschultz, 33, American journalist (USA Today, New York Times, SmartMoney and Red Herring).
William Craig Reynolds, 70, American fluid physicist and mechanical engineer who specialized in turbulent flow and computational fluid dynamics.
Sir James Waddell, 89, English civil servant.
Leon Wagner, 69, American Major League Baseball player.

4
Joan Aiken, 79, English writer, author of The Wolves of Willoughby Chase.
James Counsilman, 83, American swimming coach.
John Gallacher, Baron Gallacher, 83, British life peer.
Brian Gibson, 59, English film director, What's Love Got to Do With It.
Jake Hess, 76, American southern gospel singer.
Allen H. Miner, 86, American director and screenwriter.
Jeff Nuttall, 70, English poet, publisher, actor, painter, sculptor, jazz trumpeter, social commentator and author.
Michael Straight, 87, American magazine publisher, author and a confessed spy for the KGB.
John Toland, 91, American author and historian.

5
Charles Dumas, 66, American Olympic High Jump gold medalist.
John Guerin, 64, American percussionist, heart failure.
Norman Heatley, 92, British biochemist.
Tug McGraw, 59, American Major League Baseball pitcher, brain cancer.

6
Vera Bradford, 99, Australian pianist and piano teacher.
Pierre Charles, 49, Dominican politician, Prime Minister of Dominica.
Sumita Devi, 68, Bangladeshi film actress.
John Evans, 74, British footballer.
William Hurst Rees, 86, British valuation surveyor.
Francesco Scavullo, 82, American fashion photographer.
Charles Laverne Singleton, 44, American convicted murderer, executed by lethal injection in Arkansas.
Markku Salminen, 57, Finnish orienteer.
Reg Smith, 91, English football player and manager.
Thomas Stockham, 70, American scientist, known as the "father of digital recording".

7
Shalva Apkhazava, 23, Georgian footballer.
Francis Yao Asare, Ghanaian pharmacist and politician.
Russell Blunt, 95, American sports coach.
Ingrid Thulin, 76, Swedish actress, Cries and Whispers.

8
Charles Brown, 57, American actor.
Delfín Benítez Cáceres, 93, Paraguayan football player.
Henry St John Fancourt, 103, British naval aviation pioneer.
John A. Gambling, 73, American radio host, Rambling with Gambling.
Hal Shaper, 72, South African songwriter.
Louis Stanley, 92, British author, journalist, team principal of BRM, stroke.

9
Norberto Bobbio, 94, Italian senator, jurist, philosopher and political scientist.
Lyndon Brook, 77, British actor.
Yinka Dare, 31, Nigerian basketball player, heart attack.
Nissim Ezekiel, 79, Indian poet, playwright and art critic.
Rainer Hildebrandt, 89, German anti-communist resistance fighter and historian.
Raymond Dayle Rowsey, 32, American convicted murderer, executed by lethal injection in North Carolina.
Rogério Sganzerla, 57, Brazilian filmmaker, brain tumor.

10
Princess Kira of Prussia, 60, German princess.
Sir Henry Leask, 90, British army general.
Ewald Pyle, 93, American baseball player (St. Louis Browns, Washington Senators, New York Giants, Boston Braves).
Alexandra Ripley, 70, American author, Scarlett.

11
Max D. Barnes, 67, country singer and songwriter.
Clement Conger, 91, American museum curator.
Perry B. Duryea Jr., 82, American politician.
Spalding Gray, 62, American actor and writer, suicide by drowning.
Anthony "Tuba Fats" Lacen, 53, American New Orleans jazz musician.
Elza Mayhew, 87, Canadian sculptor.
Mervyn Pike, Baroness Pike, 85, British politician.
Asrul Sani, 76, Indonesian writer, poet and screenwriter.

12
Ramakrishna Hegde, 77, Indian politician.
Fred Holstein, 61, American folk music singer, complications from abdominal surgery.
Olga Ladyzhenskaya, 81, Soviet and Russian  mathematician.
Randy VanWarmer, 48, American singer and songwriter ("Just When I Needed You Most").
David C. C. Watson, 83, English teacher, author and creationist.
William T. Young, 85, American businessman.

13
Phillip Crosby, 69, American actor and singer, member of Crosby Boys band, son of crooner Bing Crosby.
Rafael Gambra Ciudad, 83, Spanish philosopher.
Mike Goliat, 82, American baseball player (Philadelphia Phillies, St. Louis Browns).
Tom Hurndall, 22, British political activist.
Arne Næss, Jr., 66, Norwegian mountaineer and businessman, former husband of Diana Ross.
Arthur Nobile, 83, American microbiologist.
Harold Shipman, 54, British serial killer.
Alan V. Tishman, 86, American real estate developer.
Zeno Vendler, 82, American philosopher and linguist.

14
Terje Bakken, 25, Norwegian black metal musician (Windir), hypothermia.
Jack Cady, 71, American science fiction writer.
Uta Hagen, 84, German-born American actress (Who's Afraid of Virginia Woolf?, Reversal of Fortune, The Boys from Brazil), Tony winner (1951, 1963).
Verna Elizabeth Watre Ingty, Indian social worker.
Joaquín Nin-Culmell, 95, Cuban-Spanish composer, concert pianist and emeritus professor of music at the University of California, Berkeley.
Ron O'Neal, 66, American actor (Superfly, Red Dawn, A Different World).
Eduard Sibiryakov, 62, Soviet Olympic volleyball player (men's volleyball tournament: 1964 gold medal winner, 1968 gold medal winner).
Eric Sturgess, 83, South African tennis player, winner of six Grand Slam doubles titles (five mixed doubles, one men's doubles).

15
Alex Barris, 81, Canadian actor and writer.
Robert-Ambroise-Marie Carré, 95, French Catholic priest, member of the Académie française.
Jim Devlin, 81, American baseball player (Cleveland Indians).
Olivia Goldsmith, 54, American author.
Gus Suhr, 98, American baseball player, former player for Pittsburgh Pirates.

16
Howard E. Babbush, 62, American lawyer and politician.
Mary Byrne, 86, Irish politician, first female Mayor of Galway (1975-1976).
John Siomos, 56, American rock drummer.
Kalevi Sorsa, 73, Finnish politician, former Finnish prime minister (1972–1975, 1977–1979, 1982–1987).

17
Raymond Bonham Carter, 74, British banker.
Harry Brecheen, 89, American baseball player, former Major League Baseball pitcher.
Rafael Cordero, 61, Puerto Rican politician, mayor of Ponce, Puerto Rico.
Hersh Freeman, 75, American baseball player (Boston Red Sox, Cincinnati Redlegs, Chicago Cubs).
Czesław Niemen, 64, Polish musician.
Tom Rowe, 53, American musician, member of Schooner Fare.
Carlton R. Sickles, 82, American lawyer and politician (U.S. Representative for Maryland's at-large congressional seat). 
Ray Stark, 88, American film producer (Funny Girl, Steel Magnolias, Annie).
Noble Willingham, 72, American actor (Walker, Texas Ranger, City Slickers, Norma Rae), heart attack.

18
Derek Birnage, 90, British comics writer and newspaper editor.
Hook Dillon, 80, American basketball player.
Frederick D. Sulcer, 77, American copywriter and executive.

19
Tommy Glaviano, 80, American baseball player (St. Louis Cardinals, Philadelphia Phillies).
Teresa Ferster Glazier, 96, American nonfiction writer, author of The Least You Should Know About English.
David Hookes, 48, Australian cricketer and Victorian coach.
Jerry Nachman, 57, American MSNBC editor-in-chief.
Robert Shope, 74, American virologist, epidemiologist and public health expert.

20
Alan Brown, 84, British Formula One driver.
Lloyd Merriman, 79, American baseball player (Cincinnati Reds/Redlegs, Chicago White Sox, Chicago Cubs).
T. Nadaraja, 86, Sri Lankan academic lawyer.
Bernard Punsly, 80, American physician and actor, cancer.
Don Shinnick, 68, American professional football player (UCLA, Baltimore Colts) and coach.
Guinn Smith, 83, American Olympic pole vaulter (gold medal winner in men's pole vault at the 1948 Summer Olympics).
George Woodbridge, 73, American illustrator.

21
Johnny Blatnik, 82, American baseball player (Philadelphia Phillies, St. Louis Cardinals).
Kenneth Hubbard, 83, British pilot.
John T. Lewis, 71, Welsh physicist.
Jock Newall, 86, New Zealand football player.
Yordan Radichkov, 74, Bulgarian writer and playwright.
Ray Rayner, 84, American actor and Chicago children television entertainer (Bozo's Circus, Ray Rayner and His Friends).

22
Chea Vichea, Cambodian labor leader.
Islwyn Ffowc Elis, 79, Welsh Welsh-language writer.
Billy May, 87, American big band and pop music arranger.
Tom Mead, 85, Australian politician.
Ann Miller, 81, American dancer.
Royce Smith, 54, American professional football player (Georgia, New Orleans Saints, Atlanta Falcons).
Charles-Gustave Stoskopf, 96, French architect.

23
Séamus Egan, 80, Irish judge and barrister, died in 2004.
Bob Keeshan, 76, American actor, starred as "Captain Kangaroo".
Vasili Mitrokhin, 81, Soviet/Russian/British KGB-officer and defector.
Helmut Newton, 83, German-born Australian photographer.
Lennart Strand, 82, Swedish Olympic middle-distance runner (silver medal winner in men's 1500 metres at the 1948 Summer Olympics).
Tom Warhurst Sr., 86, Australian tennis player.

24
Reva Brooks, 90, Canadian photographer.
Leônidas, 90, Brazilian football player and commentator, f complications of Alzheimer's disease.
Abdul Rahman Munif, 70, Saudi novelist, journalist, and cultural critic, kidney and heart failure.
Vladimir Nekora, 65, Yugoslavian (Croatian) Olympic rower (men's coxed four rowing at the 1960 Summer Olympics).
Donald Schmuck, 88, United States Marine Corps brigadier general.
Leônidas da Silva, 90, Brazilian football player, complications due to Alzheimer's disease.
Jack Tunney, 69, Canadian professional wrestling promoter, heart attack.

25
Fanny Blankers-Koen, 85, Dutch track and field athlete who won four gold medals at the 1948 Summer Olympics.
Miklós Fehér, 24, Hungarian football player, cardiac arrest.
J. R. Mitchell, 66, American jazz drummer.
Zurab Sakandelidze, 58, Soviet (Georgian) Olympic basketball player (men's basketball: 1968 bronze medal winner, 1972 gold medal winner).
V. K. N., 74, Indian Malayalam writer.
Robert Wood, 77, American Olympic sailor.

26
Wilhelmina Barns-Graham, 91, British artist.
Fred Haas, 88, American golfer.
Hugh Jenkins, Baron Jenkins of Putney, 95, British politician.
Jacob Mishler, 92, American judge (United States district judge of the United States District Court for the Eastern District of New York).
Andrew Morrison, 84, Guyanese Roman Catholic Jesuit priest and journalist.

27
Rikki Fulton, 79, Scottish comedian.
Hard Boiled Haggerty, 78, American professional wrestler and actor (Foxy Brown, Paint Your Wagon, Micki & Maude).
Salvador Laurel, 75, Filipino lawyer and politician, Vice President (1986–1992).
Jack Paar, 85, American author, and The Tonight Show host.
Harold Price, 95, American business executive and philanthropist, built a business empire on Cottage Donuts and Popsicles.

28
Lloyd M. Bucher, 76, United States Navy officer.
Elroy Hirsch, 80, American football player, Pro Football Hall of Fame.
S. Lewis Johnson, 88, American theologian and pastor.
Alaettin Tahir, 55, Macedonian poet, heart attack.
Joe Viterelli, 66, American actor (Analyze This, Bullets Over Broadway, Shallow Hal), complications from heart surgery.
Sox Walseth, 77, American college basketball coach.

29
Mary-Ellis Bunim, 57, American producer and co-creator of The Real World.
O. W. Fischer, 88, Austrian actor.
Janet Frame, 79, New Zealand writer.
M. M. Kaye, 95, British author, The Far Pavilions.
Guusje Nederhorst, 34, Dutch actress.
Louie B. Nunn, 79, American politician, Governor of Kentucky (1967-1971).
Stojan Puc, 82, Yugoslavian (Slovenian) chess International Master.
Soko Richardson, 64, American rhythm and blues drummer (Ike & Tina Turner, John Mayall & the Bluesbreakers, Albert Collins).
James Saunders, 79, British playwright.
Ed Sciaky, 55, American broadcaster and disk jockey.
Helge Seip, 84, Norwegian politician (Social Liberal Party).
Serafim Tulikov, 89, Soviet/Russian composer.

30
George Bennions, 90, British World War II fighter pilot.
Malachi Favors, 76, American jazz bassist, pancreatic cancer.
Cristina Gutierrez, 52, American criminal defense attorney, heart attack.
Robert Harth, 47, American executive director of Carnegie Hall.
Fuad Rouhani, 96, Iranian administrator and translator.

31
Ernest Burke, 79, American baseball player.
Eleanor Holm, 90, American Olympic swimmer (women's 100 metre backstroke: 1928, 1932 gold medal winner).
Suraiya, 75, Indian actress and singer.
Scott Walker, 34, US boxer, Pink Cat, last one to beat Alexis Argüello.

References 

2004-01
 01